Richard Callicott (1604–1686) (also spelled "Collacott," "Collicot", "Calicot", "Collacot") was a New England colonist who was a fur trader, land investor, and early leader of the Massachusetts Bay Colony. He also had two Indian servants who became prominent translators in New York and New England.

Callicott was born in Barnstaple, Devon, England in 1604. He settled in Massachusetts in 1631/32 in the area which was then known as Dorchester, Massachusetts and now known as Milton, Massachusetts near where Israel Stoughton built his grist mill in 1634. Callicott built a wharf and trading post on the Neponset River to trade with the local Indians, and he purchased large grants of land from Sachem Cutshamekin. Callicott constructed his "house in 1634 at [what is now] the Northwest corner of Adams and Center Streets in present day Milton (then Dorchester) on the Colonial Road to Plymouth. Not far away, he built a wharf on Gulliver's Creek as a landing for smaller boats to carry the furs to market." Callicot was a leader in the First Parish Church of Dorchester. Callicott took in several Native American orphans as servants including John Sassamon, who became a notable figure as a missionary and adversary of King Philip. Callicot served in Massachusetts Bay as a surveyor, selectman, deputy, and commissary for the troops during the Pequot War in 1637. During the War, Callicot received a captured Indian, known as Cockenoe, as a servant, and Cockenoe later became a translator for John Eliot in completing the Eliot Indian Bible, the first Bible printed in America. Callicott surveyed the boundary between Dedham and Dorchester in 1638 and between Massachusetts and Connecticut in 1641. Callicott became an early member of the Ancient and Honorable Artillery Company of Massachusetts. Callicott was also an associate of Roger Williams, for whom Callicot served as his power of attorney in a legal dispute. Callicot later settled in Saco, Maine for a period and Falmouth, Maine, before returning to Boston. Callicott died in Boston in 1686 and is buried in the Copp's Hill Burying Ground. Callicott's daughter, Bethiah, married the son of Daniel Gookin, a politician, military leader, and writer about Native Americans.

References

1604 births
1686 deaths
People from colonial Boston
Businesspeople from Barnstaple
Kingdom of England emigrants to Massachusetts Bay Colony
Burials in Boston